Camarea is a genus of flowering plants belonging to the family Malpighiaceae.

Its native range is Eastern Southern America.

Species:

Camarea affinis 
Camarea axillaris 
Camarea elongata 
Camarea ericoides 
Camarea glazioviana 
Camarea hirsuta 
Camarea humifusa 
Camarea sericea 
Camarea triphylla

References

Malpighiaceae
Malpighiaceae genera